Pavam Pavam Rajakumaran is a 1990 Indian Malayalam-language romantic comedy film directed by Kamal and written by Sreenivasan. The film is based on the short story Kottu Baakki by S. K. Pottekkad. This film stars Sreenivasan, Rekha, Siddique, Jagadish and Maniyanpilla Raju. Jayaram appears in an extended guest role in the film, which was a huge hit at the box office. The sub-plots of the movie were used in the 1991 Tamil movie Gopura Vasalile.

Plot

The film is about 4 parallel college teachers - Gopalakrishnan (Sreenivasan), Aravindan (Siddique), Sujanapalan (Jagadish) and Gangan (Maniyanpilla Raju) who reside in the same rented house. Gopalakrishnan, who is the Hindi teacher, is a miser and apart from sharing the rent, does not contribute money for any household or luxury items, even in dangerous or urgent situations. Due to Gopalakrishnan's uncooperative and miserly behaviour and his weakness that he is searching girls for marriage, his friends decide to fool him by posting him love letters in the name of a fictitious girl named Radhika and kick him out of the house, allowing them to fulfil their desires. They succeed in making him believe that a girl named Radhika has fallen for him.

Gopalakrishnan sees and secretly follows a woman, finds out her name is Radhika (Rekha) and that she is a banker working near his college after his friends post him a letter saying she uses a certain bus service. He mistakes her to be the one who has been posting him the love letters. Upon finding some information about Radhika, they persuade Shankarettan (Mamukkoya), the alcoholic peon in the bank where Radhika works, to help them write the letters. They make sure that he never meets Radhika personally through their letters, and to give anything he  buys for her or any letters he writes to her Shankarettan. There is a change in Gopalakrishnan's frugal behaviour and his friends enjoy by posting love letters regularly, making him buy what they want, including chairs and a television under the pretext that Radhika had come to their house and she wanted such facilities, and alcohol by claiming it was for her drunk father and taking it for themselves through Shankarettan. They succeed in covering it up from Gopalakrishnan initially.

He gradually develops an intimate relationship with Radhika, but all his efforts to meet her are in vain. He decides to commit suicide when his mother refuses to his marriage with Radhika, but she later agrees. The matter starts to lose control of the three men when he actually meets Radhika, whom he believes to be in love with her cousin Ashok (Jayaram), she fails to identify him and treats him as a maniac. Her father K. K. Menon (Innocent) whom he had believed to be a drunk turns out to be an abstainer, and tries to assault him when he tells him to drink. Gopalakrishnan understands that his friends had fooled him and assures Radhika that he will not meet her again. Heartbroken, he leaves his job and the city. Aravindan, Sujanapalan and Gangan feel guilty for what they have done and fail to find Gopalakrishnan. They believe he has committed suicide.

After 5 years, Aravindan receives a letter from Gopalakrishnan inviting him and his friends to Lovedale, a hill station in Tamil Nadu. It is from this point that the film actually begins. He calls Sujanapalan, who calls Gangan. All are shocked to hear he is alive, and decide to go. The rest of the story is shown as a flashback through their conversation. When they arrive at Lovedale, Gopalakrishnan threatens to murder them, but forgives them. They are pleasantly surprised to see Gopalakrishnan and Radhika being happily married. Gopalakrishnan reveals that he got a job in Lovedale as a teacher and accidentally met Radhika, who was posted in Lovedale as a banker. It was destiny which made them meet again and get married.

Cast

 Sreenivasan as P. K. Gopalakrishnan
 Rekha as Radhika Menon
 Siddique as Aravindan
 Jagadish as Sujanapalan 
 Maniyanpilla Raju as Gangadharan
 Mamukkoya as Sankarettan
 Jayaram as Ashok (Cameo appearance)
 Innocent as K. K. Menon, Radhika's father
 Oduvil Unnikrishnan as Principal Kurup
 K. P. A. C. Lalitha as Sarojini 
 Kottayam Santha as Gopalakrishnan's mother
 James as Postman
 Usha as Uma
 Paravoor Bharathan as Broker Narayanan Nair
 Viji Thampi as Bank Staff
 Praseetha Menon as Gopalakrishnan's sister

Remakes

Soundtrack 
The film's soundtrack contains 2 songs, both composed by Johnson and written by Kaithapram Damodaran. Both songs were chartbusters and are still popular amongst the masses.

External links

References

1990 films
1990s Malayalam-language films
Films scored by Johnson
1990 romantic comedy films
Malayalam films remade in other languages
Films directed by Kamal (director)
Indian romantic comedy films